Chimoptesis is a genus of moths belonging to the subfamily Olethreutinae of the family Tortricidae.

Species
Chimoptesis chrysopyla Powell, 1964
Chimoptesis gerulae (Heinrich, 1923)
Chimoptesis matheri Powell, 1964
Chimoptesis pennsylvaniana (Kearfott, 1907)

See also
List of Tortricidae genera

References

External links
tortricidae.com

Tortricidae genera
Olethreutinae